The men's sabre competition in fencing at the 2016 Summer Olympics in Rio de Janeiro was held on 10 August at the Carioca Arena 3. There were 32 competitors from 25 nations. The event was won by Áron Szilágyi of Hungary, the fourth man to successfully defend an Olympic title in the sabre and 14th to win multiple medals of any color. It was Hungary's 14th gold medal in the event, half of all possible. Daryl Homer earned the United States' first medal in the event since 1984 with his silver, while Kim Jung-hwan took South Korea's first individual men's sabre medal ever with his bronze.

Background

This was the 28th appearance of the event, which is the only fencing event to have been held at every Summer Olympics. Five of the quarterfinalists from 2008 returned: gold medalist Áron Szilágyi of Hungary, silver medalist Diego Occhiuzzi of Italy, bronze medalist Nikolay Kovalev of Russia, sixth-place finisher Daryl Homer of the United States, and seventh-place finisher Max Hartung of Germany. Russia had three different fencers win the three world championships since the 2012 Games: Veniamin Reshetnikov in 2013, Nikolay Kovalev in 2014, and Aleksey Yakimenko in 2015; with the national limit reduced to two fencers for the 2016 sabre competition, only Kovalev and Yakimenko entered the event. South Korea's Kim Jung-hwan was the top seed.

Benin made its debut in the men's sabre. Italy made its 26th appearance in the event, most of any nation, having missed the inaugural 1896 event and the 1904 Games.

Qualification

Nations were limited to three fencers each from 1928 to 2004. However, the 2008 Games introduced a rotation of men's team fencing events with one weapon left off each Games; the individual event without a corresponding team event had the number of fencers per nation reduced to two. Men's sabre was the third event to which this applied, missing its team event in 2016, so the limit for individual men's sabre at this Games was two.

There were 32 dedicated quota spots for men's foil. The first 14 spots went to the top ranked individual fencers in the world rankings (adjusted to allow only two per nation). Next, 8 more men were selected from the world rankings based on continents: 2 each from Europe, the Americas, Asia/Oceania, and Africa. Each nation could only earn one spot from this continental ranking, but this could be added to a world ranking place (for a total of two). Finally, 10 spots were allocated by continental qualifying events: 4 from Europe, 2 from the Americas, 3 from Asia/Oceania, and 1 from Africa. Only nations without any fencers already qualified could enter these events, and only one fencer per nation could 

Additionally, there were 8 host/invitational spots that could be spread throughout the various fencing events. Brazil had qualified one sabreur and elected not to use a host spot to add a second.

Competition format

The 1996 tournament had vastly simplified the competition format into a single-elimination bracket, with a bronze medal match. The 2016 tournament continued to use that format. Fencing was done to 15 touches or to the completion of three three-minute rounds if neither fencer reached 15 touches by then. At the end of time, the higher-scoring fencer was the winner; a tie resulted in an additional one-minute sudden-death time period. This sudden-death period was further modified by the selection of a draw-winner beforehand; if neither fencer scored a touch during the minute, the predetermined draw-winner won the bout. Standard sabre rules regarding target area, striking, and priority were used.

Schedule 

All times are Brasília Time (UTC-03:00)

Results

Top half

Bottom half

Finals

Final classification

References

Men's sabre
Men's events at the 2016 Summer Olympics